The 1980 Eastern Illinois Panthers football team represented Eastern Illinois University during the 1980 NCAA Division II football season, and completed the 79th season of Panther football. The Panthers played their home games at O'Brien Stadium in Charleston, Illinois. This season was the last that Eastern Illinois played at the Division II level.

Schedule

References

Eastern Illinois
Eastern Illinois Panthers football seasons
Eastern Illinois Panthers football
Association of Mid-Continent Universities football champion seasons